WCOS-TV, UHF analog channel 25, was a television station licensed to Columbia, South Carolina, United States. The first television station to broadcast in South Carolina, it was owned by Radio Columbia alongside the WCOS radio stations (1400 AM and 97.9 FM). It operated from 1953 until 1956, when it shut down and sold its assets to competitor WNOK-TV (channel 67) amid a difficult economic environment for UHF television stations.

History
The Federal Communications Commission (FCC) approved construction permit grants for WCOS-TV and WNOK-TV simultaneously in September 1952. Broadcasting from channel 25 began on May 1, 1953; the television station's studios, in a Quonset hut, and transmitter were located off Two Notch Road. It decided to operate with a lower effective radiated power than authorized—15,700 watts—because it had been advised by a manufacturer that a transmitter to operate with its full authorized power would be not be immediately available. At launch, the primary local shows were a daily sports program and weather report.

When it signed on, WCOS was a primary affiliate of ABC. NBC programs aired on channel 25 at the outset. However, this was a temporary arrangement. NBC's radio affiliate in Columbia, WIS (560 AM), had filed for VHF channel 10—the only assignment on the preferred VHF band available in central South Carolina. A competing application from WMSC (1320 AM) held up adjudication of the prized channel until WIS and WMSC merged their applications in February 1953, clearing the way for WIS-TV. That station started up with NBC programs on November 7. By that time, WNOK-TV had also started with CBS and DuMont programs on September 1. DuMont later moved to channel 25 by 1955.

In the days before the All-Channel Receiver Act, the presence of a VHF station in town, even though channel 25 was not Columbia's only UHF outlet, hurt it economically. In January 1956, WNOK-TV purchased most of WCOS-TV's assets (excluding its physical plant). WCOS-TV then ceased broadcasting on January 21; the WCOS radio stations continued in operation. Television Digest noted that the station "simply could not stand the economic gaff". The Shakespeare Road facilities were later used to start WCCA-TV in 1961.
In between, the Quonset hut was operated as a recording studio for the production of radio commercials and jingles; in 1959, "Stay" by Maurice Williams and the Zodiacs was recorded there.

The current channel 25, now WOLO-TV, has long claimed WCOS-TV's history as its own, at least as early as 1986.

Note

References

Television channels and stations established in 1953
1953 establishments in South Carolina
Television channels and stations disestablished in 1956
1956 disestablishments in South Carolina
COS-TV
Defunct television stations in the United States